Culver is an unincorporated community in Elliott County, Kentucky, United States.  It lies along Route 486 east of the city of Sandy Hook, the county seat of Elliott County.  Its elevation is 735 feet (224 m).

References

Unincorporated communities in Elliott County, Kentucky
Unincorporated communities in Kentucky